There were a total of 440 members of the State Duma at the end of the 7th convocation. 450 members of State Duma were elected in the 2021 legislative election.

A total of 151 incumbent State Duma members declined to seek re-election. Among retiring members are Vice Speaker Igor Lebedev (LDPR), Chair of the Committee on Health Dmitry Morozov (United Russia), and Chair of the Committee on Issues of Family, Women and Children Tamara Pletnyova (CPRF). The most prominent State Duma member to lose renomination is six-term deputy Nikolay Gonchar (United Russia), former Budget Committee Chairman who lost the primary in the Central constituency to municipal deputy Karen Aperyan.

Three Committee chairmen lost re-election to the State Duma, including Chairwoman of the Committee on Control and Rules Olga Savastyanova (United Russia), Chairman of the Committee on Economic Policy, Industry, Innovative Development, and Entrepreneurship Sergey Zhigarev (LDPR) and Chairman of the Committee on Nationalities Valery Gazzaev (SR-ZP).

Retired
Following incumbent State Duma members declined to seek re-election:

Ran for other offices
Following State Duma members declined to seek re-election and opted to run for other offices (all of them ran for regional parliaments).

Lost renomination
Only United Russia held open primaries (called "preliminary voting") for the 2021 legislative election on 24–30 May 2021. A total of 41 incumbents were defeated or not included into the official party list. Despite party's claims that every candidate should go through the process of primaries in fact several nominated in the general election candidates did not participate in the primaries in 2021. These candidates are mostly Governors who are not likely to step down from the governorship, but this group also include other examples: all 5 party list leaders (Defense Minister Sergey Shoygu, Foreign Minister Sergey Lavrov, doctor Denis Protsenko, co-chairwoman of the All-Russia People's Front Yelena Shmelyova and Children's Rights Commissioner Anna Kuznetsova), former Head of Tuva Sholban Kara-ool, former Ulyanovsk Oblast Governor Sergey Morozov, chairman of the Duma Defense Committee Vladimir Shamanov and long-time State Duma member Artur Chilingarov.

Lost re-election
Following State Duma members lost re-election in 2021:

See also
List of members of the 7th Russian State Duma
2021 Russian legislative election

Notes

References

Members defeated
7th
Members defeated
7th Duma